Jason van Dalen (born 2 July 1994) is a Dutch cyclist, who currently rides for UCI Continental team .

Major results

2016
 1st Stage 5 Vuelta a Zamora
2017
 1st Stage 2 Okolo Jižních Čech
2018
 1st Stage 3b Sibiu Cycling Tour
 5th Overall Rás Tailteann
1st Stage 4
 6th Overall Tour de Normandie
 7th Ronde van Midden-Nederland
 7th Ronde van Overijssel
 8th Ronde van Noord-Holland
 8th Tacx Pro Classic
 8th Veenendaal–Veenendaal Classic
 9th Fyen Rundt

References

External links

1994 births
Living people
Dutch male cyclists
21st-century Dutch people